Per á Hædd is a Faroese photographer based in Tórshavn whose photographs were featured on stamps issued in 1999:

and later on stamps issued in the year 2000:

External links
 Per á Hædd "Colour Art Photo" website

Faroese artists
Living people
Year of birth missing (living people)